Jonesville Cemetery is a historic rural cemetery located at Jonesville, Saratoga County, New York. The cemetery was established in 1864, and designed by Burton A. Thomas.  It includes the remains of 252 individuals who were relocated early in the cemetery's history and date between 1799 and 1863.  It remains an active burial ground.

It was listed on the National Register of Historic Places in 2014.

References

External links
 
 

Cemeteries on the National Register of Historic Places in New York (state)
1864 establishments in New York (state)
Buildings and structures in Saratoga County, New York
National Register of Historic Places in Saratoga County, New York